The Tour of Alanya is an international road cycling race organized by the Turkish Cycling Federation at Alanya, Antalya Province in southern Turkey. It is part of the UCI Europe Tour having a rating of 2.2.

It was first held in 2010 between November 4–7, at which 70 racers of ten international teams competed in four categories.

Winners

References

Alanya
Recurring sporting events established in 2010
2010 establishments in Turkey
Sport in Antalya
UCI Europe Tour races
Autumn events in Turkey